Zdravko Hebel (21 January 1943 – 12 August 2017) was a Croatian water polo player notable for winning a gold medal in Mexico City in 1968, with the Yugoslavian water polo team.

Hebel served as the president of the Croatian Olympic Committee from 2000 to 2002.

See also
 Yugoslavia men's Olympic water polo team records and statistics
 List of Olympic champions in men's water polo
 List of Olympic medalists in water polo (men)
 List of men's Olympic water polo tournament goalkeepers

References
 Preminuo bivši predsjednik HOO-a Zdravko Hebel

External links
 

1943 births
2017 deaths
Sportspeople from Zagreb
Croatian male water polo players
Yugoslav male water polo players
Water polo goalkeepers
Olympic water polo players of Yugoslavia
Olympic gold medalists for Yugoslavia
Water polo players at the 1968 Summer Olympics
Olympic medalists in water polo
Medalists at the 1968 Summer Olympics
Croatian sports executives and administrators